Judge Andrews may refer to:

M. Neil Andrews (1894–1967), judge of the United States District Court for the Northern District of Georgia
Richard G. Andrews (born 1955), judge of the United States District Court for the District of Delaware

See also
Justice Andrews (disambiguation)